Chico (born 1985/1986) is the pseudonym of an anonymous Egyptian street artist and graffiti artist whose work has gained popularity and notoriety in Egypt following the 2011 Egyptian Revolution.

Career and artwork
Chico claims not to have studied art formally, although he now teaches it. He has said that he has always been "interested in graffiti and stencils in particular." Chico has stated that he works with stencils because they are "fast and safe." During the days of the revolution, he and fellow Egyptian graffiti artist El Teneen spray painted stencils on surfaces in public spaces, such as lampposts and walls, in downtown Cairo. However, these stencils were often quickly identified by security forces and removed, sometimes within minutes.

Since the 2011 revolution, Chico's work has been noted for its political content and criticism of the Supreme Council of the Armed Forces, or SCAF, which as ruled the country since the February, 2011 resignation of former president Housni Mubarak. He said during the February revolution that contemporary political events had led to the politicization of his artwork, stating that "[m]y work has not always addressed the political situation. I have expressed a variety of issues, including social grievances, on the streets of Cairo and Alexandria. But the Egyptian government does not want to differentiate between political and non-political messages. They are not welcomed by the government, regardless of the topic."

See also
Ganzeer
Keizer (artist)
List of urban artists
 Egyptian Arts post Revolution

References

Egyptian contemporary artists
Egyptian graffiti artists
Pseudonymous artists
Living people
Year of birth uncertain
1980 births